Titanopsis calcarea, commonly called the jewel plant, is a species of ice plant in the genus Titanopsis, native to South Africa. A succulent, it has gained the Royal Horticultural Society's Award of Garden Merit as an ornamental.

German-South African botanist Rudolf Marloth described the species in 1926 as Mesembryanthemum calcareum, before Martin Heinrich Gustav Schwantes placed it in the genus Titanopsis.

References

Aizoaceae
Endemic flora of South Africa
Plants described in 1926